Complement component 5 is a protein that in humans is encoded by the C5 gene.

Complement component 5 is involved in the complement system. It is cleaved into C5a and C5b:
 C5a plays an important role in chemotaxis.
 C5b forms the first part of the complement membrane attack complex.

Deficiency is thought to cause Leiner's disease.

Function 

Complement component 5 is the fifth component of complement, which plays an important role in inflammatory and cell killing processes. This protein is composed of alpha and beta polypeptide chains that are linked by a disulfide bridge. An activation peptide, C5a, which is an anaphylatoxin that possesses potent spasmogenic and chemotactic activity, is derived from the alpha polypeptide via cleavage with a C5-convertase. The C5b macromolecular cleavage product can form a complex with the C6 complement component, and this complex is the basis for formation of the membrane attack complex, which includes additional complement components.

Clinical significance 

Mutations in this gene cause complement component 5 deficiency, a disease where patients show a propensity for severe recurrent infections. Defects in this gene have also been linked to a susceptibility to liver fibrosis and to rheumatoid arthritis.

Therapeutic applications 

The drug eculizumab (trade name Soliris) prevents cleavage of C5 into C5a and C5b.

Complement system pathway

References

Further reading

External links
 

Complement system